Towles Farmstead, also known as Goshen Plantation and Plainsfield, is a historic farmstead and national historic district located near Meggett, Charleston County, South Carolina. The district encompasses 11 contributing buildings, 2 contributing sites, and 1 contributing structure.  They include two early-20th century residences: a one-story, frame house constructed about 1903, with characteristic Neo-Classical and Bungalow features; and a two-story, rectangular frame house constructed in 1930, with characteristic Colonial Revival and Italian Renaissance features. Associated with the houses are a variety of contributing utility outbuildings.

It was listed on the National Register of Historic Places in 1994.

References

Historic districts on the National Register of Historic Places in South Carolina
Houses on the National Register of Historic Places in South Carolina
Houses completed in 1903
Renaissance Revival architecture in South Carolina
Colonial Revival architecture in South Carolina
Neoclassical architecture in South Carolina
Houses in Charleston County, South Carolina
National Register of Historic Places in Charleston County, South Carolina